League of Villains may refer to:

League of Villains (My Hero Academia), a fictional organization in the manga series My Hero Academia
"The League of Villains", an episode of The Adventures of Jimmy Neutron: Boy Genius